Saint-Jean-de-Niost is a commune in the Ain department in eastern France.

It lies on the edge of the Ain plain between Meximieux and Saint-Maurice-de-Gourdans.

Population

See also
Communes of the Ain department

References

External links
 Official site

Communes of Ain
Ain communes articles needing translation from French Wikipedia